
The Condor Legion Tank Badge was a German military decoration awarded to tank crews who served with the German Condor Legion during the Spanish Civil War, 1936–1939.

Eligibility  
The Condor Legion was established in July 1936 to provide direct military support to the Nationalists during the Spanish Civil War. The Legion, consisting of members of the German Wehrmacht, included armoured units equipped with Panzer I light tanks under the command of Colonel Wilhelm Ritter von Thoma. The Legion continued to serve in Spain until the end of the war in April 1939.

The Tank Badge was created in September 1936 by Colonel Von Thoma, and was recognised as an official award of the German state on 10 July 1939. It was awarded to tank crews who had served for at least three months in the Spanish theatre of war. Issue of the badge was discontinued in the autumn of 1939, by which time 415 had been awarded.

Design and wear
The badge consists of an oval wreath of oakleaves containing a skull and crossbones above a representation of a German Panzer I tank. The skull and crossbones were derived from the cap insignia of the tank troops of Legion Condor. The design is similar to the Tank Memorial Badge awarded to tank crews who served in World War I. It was issued in both white metal and bright bronze, with a gold version presented to Colonel von Thoma in 1939 after a victory parade in Madrid to mark the end of the Civil War.

The badge was worn on the left breast pocket. 

The wear of Nazi era awards was banned in 1945. The Condor Legion Tank Badge was not among the Nazi era awards reauthorised for official wear by the Federal Republic of Germany in 1957.

References

Sources 

Website: Lexikon der Wehrmacht: Panzertruppenabzeichen der Legion Condor (In German)

See also 
 Orders, decorations, and medals of Nazi Germany
 Spanish Cross of the Condor Legion
 Panzer Badge (World War II)

Military awards and decorations of Nazi Germany
Awards established in 1936
1936 establishments in Germany
Military awards and decorations of the Spanish Civil War
Germany–Spain military relations
History of the tank